The Hit is a 1981 Czechoslovak comedy film directed by Zdeněk Podskalský. It featured, among other Czech performers, the singer Waldemar Matuška.

External links
 

1980 comedy films
1980 films
1980s Czech-language films
Czechoslovak comedy films
Films directed by Zdeněk Podskalský
Czech comedy films
Films with screenplays by Zdeněk Svěrák
1980s Czech films